Shushan Bridge is a covered bridge over the Batten Kill in the hamlet of Shushan in Washington County, New York, near Vermont.  It is one of 29 surviving historic covered bridges in New York State, and one of 4 surviving in Washington County.

It was built in 1858 by builder Milton Stevens.

Town and Howe truss designs were patented by Ithiel Town in 1820 and William Howe in 1840, respectively.  The Shushan Bridge employs "the patented Town lattice truss, consisting of top and bottom chords of laminated wood plank, and a web of diagonal wood planks connected by wood trunnels at each point of intersection".

It was individually inventoried by the New York State Office of Parks, Recreation and Historic Preservation in 1977.

It is one of four Washington County covered bridges submitted for listing in the National Register of Historic Places in one multiple property submission.  The others are the Buskirk Bridge, the Rexleigh Bridge, and Eagleville Bridge.  All four were listed on the National Register of Historic Places on March 8, 1972.

The Shushan bridge was closed to traffic in 1962, and was left abandoned for 10 years, then saved by local preservation efforts.  Now it is operated as a seasonal museum.

References

External links
Shushan Covered Bridge (official site?)
 Shushan Bridge, at New York State Covered Bridge Society
 Shushan Bridge, at Covered Bridges of the Northeast USA, a website developed by Hank Brickel

Covered bridges on the National Register of Historic Places in New York (state)
Bridges completed in 1858
Wooden bridges in New York (state)
Museums in Washington County, New York
History museums in New York (state)
Bridges in Washington County, New York
National Register of Historic Places in Washington County, New York
Road bridges on the National Register of Historic Places in New York (state)
Lattice truss bridges in the United States